A tadpole is the aquatic larval stage in the life cycle of an amphibian.

Tadpole or Tadpoles may also refer to:

Transportation
Tadpole (dinghy), a small boat
Grumman G-65 Tadpole, an American prototype light amphibian airplane first flown in 1944
Armstrong Whitworth Tadpole, a variant of the Westland Walrus reconnaissance aircraft of the 1920s
Tadpole, a type of three-wheeled car
Tadpole, a type of tricycle

Places
Tadpole Bridge, in Oxfordshire, England
Tadpole Galaxy, a galaxy with a long tidal trail
Mount Tadpole, Oates Land, Antarctica
Tadpole Island, Graham Land, Antarctica

Music
Tadpole (band), a New Zealand band
Tadpole (album), an album by Tadpole
Tadpoles (band), an American psychedelic rock band
Tadpoles (album), an album by the Bonzo Dog Band

Film and television
Tadpole (film), a 2002 American film directed by Gary Winick
"Tadpole" or Tad Reeves, a character in the Australian soap opera Neighbours
one of the title characters of the American animated TV series Spunky and Tadpole, which aired from 1958 to 1961

Other uses
Tadpole (physics), a type of Feynman diagram
Tadpole Computer, an American computer company
Tadpole Bridge, across the River Thames in Oxfordshire, England
 Tadpole pupil, an abnormal eye condition
"Tadpole", a nickname of Robert T. Smith (1918-1995), American World War II flying ace and Flying Tiger
Tadpole, a UK term for a type of Aqua-lung
Tadpole, a term, derived from frogman, for a child beginner scuba diver

See also
Polliwog (disambiguation)